Ingush (pronounced ) are an ethnic group mainly inhabiting Ingushetia in central Caucasus. Ingushetia is a federal republic of Russian Federation. The Ingush are predominantly Sunni Muslims and speak the Ingush language.

Etymology 
The ethnonym "Ingush" came from the name of the Ingush village Angusht, which by the end of the 17th century, was a large village in the Tarskoye Valley (modern day Prigorodny District).

The self-name of the Ingush — "Ghalghaï" (ГIалгIай) has an ancient origin. It is most often associated with the term "gala" (гIала) - tower, fortress and accordingly is translated as the builder/inhabitant of the tower, fortress. According to Victor Schnirelmann, the self-name "Ghalghaï" was established among all southwestern Vainakhs only in the 1920s. However, according to other scientists, even in the period of the second half of the XVI — the first half of the XVII century, the name "Ghalghaï" (in Russian documents of that time — Kolki, Kalki, Kalkans, (see Kalkans)) had a wide meaning and, in addition to the Ghalghaï proper, extended to other tribal groups (societies) of Mountainous Ingushetia. In the works of German researchers J. Güldenstädt, P. Pallas and J. Klaproth, it is also reported that back in the 18th century, the Ingush called themselves Ghalghaï.

History 

The ancestors of the Ingush people have been historically mentioned under many different names, such as Dzurdzuks, Kists or Ghlighvi, although none of them was used as an ethnonym and are of Georgian origin. The latter was first mentioned by the Georgian prince Vakhushti of Kartli in 1745, as a territory next to Dzurdzukia and Kisteti. These were previously known as Dzurdzukia until it's splitting. Contemporary sources also mention the ethnonym Nakhchoy, which Chechens still use today. However, due to political and hostile disagreements, the term was replaced starting from the 19th century up to the introduction of "Vainakh" ("our people" in Chechen/Ingush) in the early 20th century.«The Shatoy and Nazran (Ingush) people are reluctant to call themselves Nakhchoy, which stems from their previous hostile attitudes towards the Chechens. But with the outpouring of heartfelt feelings at meetings, at a party, on the way, etc. they always confirm their unity of tribe, expressing themselves: "We are common brothers (wai tsa vezherey detsy)" or "We are the same Nakhchoy (wai tsa nakhchoy du)".»The Ingush never had a feudal system and were always governerned by highly esteemed selected elders among the local clans. In 1770, the elders of 24 Ingush tribes signed a treaty with Russia, but are commonly considered under Russian rule from 1810. With the treaty of 1810, the Ingush obliged themselves to fulfill several duties, which included the mobilization, of at least 1000 men to fight against the enemies of Russia, more precisely the Chechens and Karabulak. However some Ingush were unwilling to conform to Russian laws and caused skirmishes with Russian forces in Ingushetia, such as the uprising of Nazran in 1858, when 5000 armed Ingush residing in Nazran tried storming the local fortress. After 2 failed attempts of aid in June and July by Imam Shamil, the Russians succeeded in suppressing the revolt. The leaders of the uprising were hanged and many of the participants physically punished. Nevertheless many Ingush, like the national hero Utsig Malsag, stood true to the oath with Russia from 1810.  Under Soviet rule during World War II the Ingush, along with the Chechens were falsely accused of collaborating with the Nazis and thus, the entire population was deported to the Kazakh and Kirghiz Soviet Socialist Republics. The Ingush were rehabilitated in the 1950s, after the death of Joseph Stalin, and allowed to return home in 1957, though by that time western Ingush lands had been ceded to North Ossetia.

Anthropology of the Ingush population 
In 1901, Scottish Geographical Magazine on pp. 570–572 mentions: "The Ingoush are considered very ancient inhabitants of the Caucasus; but their origin is lost in obscure and even contradictory traditions. They have long been supposed to be identical with the Tchetchen – an error which has recently been disproved by anthropological inquiries, which have shown that they are a distinct ethnical group of men ... The complexion of the Ingoush is swarthy; he is tall and slight in form; restless, always on the alert, inquisitive, dexterous, and usually highly intelligent ... In every respect the Ingoush prove to be, anthropologically, a group of men inhabiting the Caucasus, distinct from their neighbors, the Ossetians, Tchetchen, Lesghin, Kymykh, Circassian and Kabardin, Armenian, Georgian, Hebrew and others." According to anthropologist Ivan Pantyukhov, anthropologically the Ingush differ not only from other populations of the Caucasus; however, even Chechens with whom they form a single speech community due to passive bilingualism practiced by the Ingush people. The Soviet-Russian anthropologists and scientists N.Ya. Marr, V.V. Bounak, R.M. Munchaev, I.M Dyakonov, E.I. Krupnov and G.A. Melikashvilli wrote: "Among Ingush the Caucasian type is preserved better than among any other North Caucasian nation", Professor of anthropology V.V.Bounak "Groznenski Rabochi" 5, VII, 1935. Professor G.F. Debets recognized that Ingush Caucasian anthropologic type is the most Caucasian among Caucasians. Prussian scientist Peter Pallas visited Ingushetia and made observation of Ingush people; he also confirmed that Ingush people are completely different from their neighbors in his book “Thravels through the Southern Provinces of the Russian Empire in the years 1793 and 1794” pp. 435–436: “There is a tribe of people differing entirely from all other inhabitants of the Caucasus, in language as well as in stature, and the features of the countenance: their national name is LAMUR, signifying inhabitants of mountains; by others they are called Galgai, or Ingushians … Their manner of pronouncing appeared to us, as if their mouths were full of stones. We were informed that they are an honest and brave set of people, maintaining their independence, and are subject only to their elders, or priests, by whom their religious sacrifices are performed. They are almost the only nation inhabiting the Caucasus, among whom the shields has been preserved, as a part of their accoutrements. These bucklers are made of wood, covered with leather, and bound with iron hoops of an oval form. The short knotty pike which forms part of their armor, serves not only as a weapon of defense, but is likewise used for supporting the gun between its forked branched, by fixing the pointed end in the ground, which enabled the sharp-shooter to take a more accurate aim. The Ingushians are excellent marksmen…”

Ingush language and grammar 

According to the linguist Johanna Nichols, who studied languages including Chechen and Ingush in her book "Ingush Grammar" says: "To my surprise, Ingush turned out to be the most complex language of my sample, besting even polysynthetic languages like Seneca, Lakhota, and Halkomelem. Ingush is not polysynthetic; its complexity is due to large inventories of elements (phonemes, cases, tenses, etc.), a high degree of inflectional synthesis in the verb, and classification of various types – declension and conjugation classes, agreement genders, overt inherent genders, split verbal lexicon, split alignment, etc. Perhaps this complexity explains why it has taken thirty years to produce this grammar, during most of which time the project has in fact been on or near the front burner ... Ingush and Chechen are distinct languages and not mutually intelligible, but because of widespread passive partial knowledge of standard lowlands Chechen by Ingush they function to some extent as a single speech community." "Ingush is the native language of the great majority of the approximately 300,000 Ingush people, most of whom live in or near the Republic of Ingushetia on the north slope of the Great Caucasus mountain range in the South Russia ... Ingush and Chechen are distinct languages and not mutually intelligible, but because of widespread passive bilingualism they form a single speech community."

Origin of the Ingush population 
According to Leonti Mroveli, the 11th-century Georgian chronicler, the word Caucasian is derived from the Vainakh ancestor Kavkas.
According to Professor George Anchabadze of Ilia State University "The Vainakhs are the ancient natives of the Caucasus. It is noteworthy, that according to the genealogical table drawn up by Leonti Mroveli, the legendary forefather of the Vainakhs was "Kavkas", hence the name Kavkasians, one of the ethnicons met in the ancient Georgian written sources, signifying the ancestors of the Chechens and Ingush. As appears from the above, the Vainakhs, at least by name, are presented as the most "Caucasian" people of all the Caucasians (Caucasus – Kavkas – Kavkasians) in the Georgian historical tradition."
In an article in Science Magazine Bernice Wuethrich states that American linguist Dr. Johanna Nichols "has used language to connect modern people of the Caucasus region to the ancient farmers of the Fertile Crescent" and that her research suggests that "farmers of the region were proto-Nakh-Daghestanians". Nichols is quoted as stating that "The Nakh–Dagestanian languages are the closest thing we have to a direct continuation of the cultural and linguistic community that gave rise to Western civilization"

Genetics of Ingushetia's population 
The Ingush have 89% of J2 Y-DNA which is the highest known frequency in the world and J2 is closely associated with the Fertile Crescent.

The mitochondrial DNA of the Ingush differs from other Caucasian populations and the rest of the world. "The Caucasus populations exhibit, on average, less variability than other [World] populations for the eight Alu insertion polymorphisms analyzed here. The average heterozygosity is less than that of any other region of the world, with the exception of Sahul. Within the Caucasus, the Ingush have much lower levels of variability than any of the other populations. The Ingush also showed unusual patterns of mtDNA variation when compared with other Caucasus populations (Nasidze and Stoneking, submitted), which indicates that some feature of the Ingush population history, or of this particular sample of the Ingush, must be responsible for their different patterns of genetic variation at both mtDNA and the Alu insertion loci."

Ingush character 
"Notes on the Caucasus" By Elim H. D'Avigdor, 1883 states: "The Ingouch have great personal pride and determination of character. Forty or fifty years ago, when slavery was an institution in the Caucasus, and people purchased servants, male and female, from the mountaineers (as now in Central Africa), Ingouch slaves were excessively rarely met with, they wither refusing to be taken alive or committing suicide.
An Ingouch whose ideas of meum and tuum were confused being detected by some Russian soldiers at Wladikavkas in the act of driving off a cow, was severely beaten that, though he contrived with great difficulty to reach his village in the mountains, he shortly afterwards died. His remaining brother, taking his rifle, ammunition, and some millet in a bag, set out alone to avenge his death. Arriving by bypaths in the vicinity of Wladikavkas, he took us a position before daylight among the rocks on the hillside, and watched till he saw a Russian soldier at a convenient distance from the lines. After stalking and “dropping” his man, which, being a good shot, her rarely failed in doing, he cut off the ears of the Russian, and made for the mountain, where he offered them up on the tomb of his brother, and again returned to prowl round the outposts. In this manned he, in the course of a few months, manager to “pot” three officers and fifteen privates, a tolerable “bag” for one man, armed with a flint rifle and inferior home-made powder."
"Ingush is brave, supremely proud, and fanatical. All these qualities of the Ingush do not allow the acceptance of external pressure."

Architecture 
The Ingush stone architecture is closely related to their way of life in the mountains. The stone architecture is known to mountain Ingushetia as early as 8,000 BC - 4,000 BC cyclopean masonry settlements Egikal, Targim, Doshkhakle, Leimi. Caucasologist Ruslan Buzurtanov mentions that every Ingush family had an architectural triad: a tower, a church, and a necropolis. All three were present in every settlement. All three evolved continuously over time. For example the Tkhaba-Yerdy Church was originally a pagan temple according to the evidence the earliest structures that dates back before the 8th-9th centuries when it was remodeled into a Christian church adding Christian crosses and reliefs but keeping the pagan petroglyphs. The Ingush stone town consisting of towers and churches were located lower than the necropolis town of the dead. Ingush necropolis had stepped roof either pyramidal or conical shape. Combat towers had stepped pyramidal roof. Necropolis evolved over time: 3,000 BC they were underground stone Kists, later grouped into pyramids, then became half underground and finally early middle ages above the ground structures. Majority of the Ingush stone necropolis and churches East of the Terek river were either partially or fully destroyed during the Soviet times especially after Ingush people were exiled en masse in 1944. The necropolis were looted by Ossetian and Russian colonists who were brought to Ingushetia after 1944. The combat towers had an entrance on the second floor which had a conical roof with a cross made of stones and a keystone which formed the floor of the next level. These conical stone crosses are unique only in the Ingush towers. The combat towers usually had five to six levels. None of the arches of windows in the combat towers had a keystone and were made of a solid blocks of stone. The famous Soviet archaeologist and historian, professor E.I. Krupnov in his book "Medieval Ingushetia" described the Ingush towers as «in the true sense the pinnacle of the architectural and constructional mastery of the ancient population of the region».

Culture 

The Ingush possess a varied culture of traditions, legends, epics, tales, songs, proverbs, and sayings. Music, songs and dance are particularly highly regarded. Popular musical instruments include the dachick-panderr (a kind of balalaika), kekhat ponder (accordion, generally played by girls), mirz ponder (a three-stringed violin), zurna (a type of oboe), tambourine, and drums.

Religion 

The Ingush are Sunni Muslims. In matters of fiqh, they adhere to the school of Imam Muhammad ash-Shafi’i, the founder of the Shafi'i madhab. They are also adherents of two Sufi tariqas: Qadiriyya and Naqshbandiya.  Before the final consolidation of Islam, the Ingush from ancient times had their traditional pagan beliefs widespread, with their own unique pantheon, developed mythology and numerous religious architectural objects. At some period, Christianity was also widespread.

Christianity 
According to the writings of the historian Bashir Dalgat, the first Christian missionaries were Georgian and they appeared in Ingushetia around the 10th century, simultaneously with the flourishing of Georgia. Christianity spread quite widely in Ingushetia and Chechnya, at the moment, on the territory of modern Chechnya, Ingushetia and North Ossetia, there are many archaeological, historical and architectural monuments confirming the centuries-old Christianity among the Ingush in particular, and the Vainakhs in general. The scientist's study describes numerous testimonies of historians and travelers of the early and middle Middle Ages, according to which churches or even, possibly, a monastery were built on the territory of the Ingush lands. In particular, according to the testimonies of Russian German scientists Johann Güldenstädt and Peter Simon Pallas, who visited Ingushetia in the 18th century, in the Tkhaba-Yerdy Church (an example of architecture of the 9th-10th centuries) ancient documents were kept, written, according to them the interlocutor-monk, «in gold, blue and black letters», that above the doors of the temple there is an inscription in «Gothic letters». Encyclopedic Dictionary of Brockhaus and Efron, published in the late XIX - early XX centuries, indicated the presence of Christians and pagans among the Ingush:

Islam 
Islam began to penetrate to the ancestors of the Ingush as early as the 8th century as a result of military campaigns of the Arabs against the Khazars and Alans, which ran through the Darial and Derbent gorges. This period includes a bronze figure of an eagle («The Eagle of Suleyman») from the tower settlement of Erzi in the Kistin Gorge of mountainous Ingushetia, which probably came here in the form of a military trophy and today is the oldest accurately dated bronze product of Islamic art. The eagle served as the coat of arms of the village of Erzi (from the Ingush. "Eagle") and was passed from generation to generation to the eldest family member. And the name of the village of Dzheyrakh in mountainous Ingushetia is associated with the name of the Arab commander Jarrah ibn-Abdullah. Also, the legends of the Ingush connect the spread of Islam among them with another Arab commander named Abu Muslim.

Some researchers tend to associate the penetration of Islam with the presence of the Mongol-Tatars in the flat regions of Ingushetia, especially with the coming to power of Khan Uzbek (r. 1312–1340), when Islamization began to be carried out more intensively. V. B. Vinogradov believed that the headquarters of Khan Uzbek was located in the area of the modern Ingush village of Plievo, the city of Karabulak and the mausoleum of Borga-Kash. This unique architectural monument was built in 1405-1406. There is an opinion that here may be buried the ruler Burakan (Borokhan), mentioned in the chronicles "Zafar-name" ("Book of Victories") Nizam-ad-din Shami, who was a contemporary and personal secretary of Tamerlan, and "Zafar-name" ("Book of Victories") Sheref-ad-din Yazdi, who lived in the first half of the XV century.

According to other sources, the flat Ingush, unlike the Ingush highlanders, begin to accept Islam in the 16th century, and the period of its wide distribution falls on the 18th century. According to the Georgian geographer and historian prince Vakhushti Bagrationi, at the beginning of the 18th century. Part of the Ingush, namely the Angusht society, were Sunni Muslims. The presence of ancient mosques of the XVIII-XIX centuries. recorded in mountainous Ingushetia.

In the first half of the 19th century, the activities of Imam Shamil played a significant role in rooting Islam among the Ingushes. During the Caucasian War, his Naqshbandi tariqa became the official ideology of the Imamate, so that some Ingush societies - Karabulaks, Galashians - became followers of the Imam's teachings.

See also 
 List of Ingush people
 Ingushetia

References

Bibliography

External links 

News and History of Ingushetia
The Ingush people

 
Peoples of the Caucasus
People
Nakh peoples
Ethnic groups in Russia
Ethnic groups in Kazakhstan
Ethnic groups in Turkey
Ethnic groups in Iraq
Muslim communities of Russia
Muslim communities of the Caucasus